Air Raiders is an action game released for the Atari 2600 by Mattel in 1982. It received mixed reviews from critics.

Game Play

The player has the view of an airstrip as seen from the cockpit of a jet fighter. In order to start the launch, it is required that the player presses the fire button.  When the player pulls back on the joystick, the jet fighter becomes airborne. A feature of the game includes a horizontal tilt that happens when the jet fighter turns to the left or the right for realistic simulation. The goal is to fire at enemy aircraft. The player also has to worry about not making a quick dive after an enemy craft that would lead to a crash landing. There is also a bar that is located on the width of the screen that allows the player to keep track of the horizontal position. It is important to stay out of heavy gunfire zones because it can lead to a nosedive crash. It is possible to pull out of a nosedive, but it would be a better idea for the player to avoid flak.

References

Further reading
Atari Times review
AtariHQ Review

External links

Atari 2600 games
Atari 2600-only games
Action video games
1982 video games
Video games developed in the United States